Lawson Health Research Institute is a large hospital-based research institute located in London, Ontario, Canada. Lawson is the research institute of London Health Sciences Centre and St. Joseph's Health Care London and works in partnership with the University of Western Ontario.

Mission
Lawson represents the merger of two previously separate research missions:
 St. Joseph's: Lawson Research Institute (LRI)
 LHSC: London Health Sciences Centre Research Inc. (LHSCRI) and Children's Health Research Institute (CHRI)

Timeline
 1983: Supported by Sister Mary Doyle, former Executive Director of St. Joseph's, the Sisters of St. Joseph's establish the hospital's official research institute. LHSC and Upjohn jointly open the Victoria Upjohn Clinical Research Unit at South Street Hospital (formerly Victoria Hospital), focusing on Phase I-III clinical trials.
 1987: The St. Joseph's research institute is named the Lawson Research Institute (LRI) in honour of London businessman and philanthropist Colonel Tom Lawson and his wife, Miggsie Lawson - close friends of Sister Mary Doyle and major supporters of the research mission.
 1990: Victoria Hospital takes over the operation of the clinical research unit at South Street, renaming it the Victoria Clinical Trials Centre.
 1997: The Victoria Clinical Trials Centre is renamed London Health Sciences Centre Research Inc. and becomes a fully incorporated research institute overseeing all hospital-based research within London Health Sciences Centre sites: Victoria Hospital, University Hospital and South Street Hospital.
 2000: LRI and LHSCRI merge to form a joint venture: Lawson Health Research Institute.
Today, this alliance allows researchers to move seamlessly between hospital locations and Western University. By pooling knowledge and resources, Lawson retains and develops the expertise, equipment and infrastructure that is crucial for innovation.

Research areas
Research themes at Lawson include:  

Aging, Rehabilitation and Geriatric Care
Cancer
Children's Health
Clinical Investigation & Therapeutics
Critical Illness
Imaging
Mental Health
Neurological disorders
Movement disorders
Surgical Innovation
Transplantation
Vascular Health & Chronic Disease

External links

Medical research institutes in Canada